During the 1994–95 season, Nantes Atlantique competed in the French Division 1, the Coupe de France, Coupe de la Ligue, and the UEFA Cup.

Nantes Atlantique won their seventh French league title, thereby qualifying for the 1995–96 UEFA Champions League. With only one loss, against RC Strasbourg on matchday 33, the club holds the record for fewest losses in a Ligue 1 season and most consecutive matches unbeaten in a single season at 32. Paris Saint-Germain would later equal Nantes' streak of 32 matches without defeat during the 2015–16 Ligue 1 season.

Squad

Source:

Overall record

Competitions

French Division 1

League table

Results summary

Results by round

Coupe de France

UEFA Cup

First round

Second round

Third round

Quarter-final

Statistics

Goal scorers

Source:

References

FC Nantes seasons
Nantes
French football championship-winning seasons